Blas Ziarreta Obregón (born 6 February 1947) is a Spanish football manager.

External links

1947 births
Living people
People from Santurtzi
Spanish football managers
Segunda División managers
Segunda División B managers
Tercera División managers
Sestao Sport managers
SD Lemona managers
Athletic Bilbao B managers
Burgos CF managers
CD Badajoz managers
SD Eibar managers
Sportspeople from Biscay